The 2018 Iranian water protests were a series of protests by the Iranians living in the cities of Khorramshahr and Abadan, who are protesting the shortage of clean drinking water. The protests started on 20 June in Abadan, before escalating on 30 June in Khorramshahr and turning violent.

Timeline

20 June
On 20 June, people in Abadan gathered in front of the water and sewage system offices and protested undrinkable water. A day before the protests, the water and sewage department in Abadan had declared that water would be rationed in Abadan.

23 June
Hundreds of people in Abadan again protested the lack of clean water in front of the Governor's office. The protesters chanted against the Governor and authorities responsible for the city's supply of water.

30 June
Hundreds of people, who were protesting the lack of clean drinking water, clashed with police on 30 June in Khorramshahr. IRNA news agency reported that the protesters were chanting slogans against the authorities. Police fired tear gas into the crowd which led to the protesters throwing rocks and garbage. Security forces eventually opened fire on the crowd, which left up to four people dead, which the authorities deny.

The protests, which were solely directed at the lack of clean water in the beginning, turned political, with people chanting "In the name of religion, they plundered us", and "Get lost, governor".

1 July
In response to the violent crackdown in Khorramshahr the previous day, thousands of people across Khuzestan province took to the streets in support of the protests in Khorramshahr. Videos on social media showed protests in Ahvaz, Mahshahr, and Bandar-e Emam Khomeyni.

References

2017–2018 Iranian protests
2018 protests
Protest marches
2018 water protests
Water protests
June 2018 events in Iran
July 2018 events in Iran